The 2003 AFC Futsal Championship was held in Tehran and Karaj, Iran from 27 July to 5 August 2003.

Venues

Draw

Group stage

Group A

Group B

Group C

Group D

Knockout stage

Quarter-finals

Semi-finals

Third place play-off

Final

Awards

 Most Valuable Player
 Vahid Shamsaei
 Top Scorer
 Vahid Shamsaei (24 goals)
 Best Goalkeeper
 Hisamitsu Kawahara
 Fair-Play Award

References

 Futsal Planet
 RSSSF

External links
 Asian Football Confederation

AFC Futsal Championship
AFC
2003
Championship